The 14th Canadian Comedy Awards, presented by the Canadian Comedy Foundation for Excellence (CCFE), honoured the best live, television, film, and Internet comedy of 2012.  The ceremony was held at Centrepointe Theatre in Ottawa, Ontario, on 6 October 2013 and was hosted by Ryan Belleville.

Canadian Comedy Awards, also known as Beavers, were awarded in 26 categories. Winners in 5 categories were chosen by the public through an online poll and others were chosen by members of industry organizations.  The awards ceremony concluded the Canadian Comedy Awards Festival which ran from 3 to 6 October and included over 20 comedy events.

The films My Awkward Sexual Adventure and Please Kill Mr. Know It All led with six nominations each, followed by the film Dead Before Dawn 3D and TV series Seed with five.  My Awkward Sexual Adventure won two Beavers, as did TV series Mr. D and Mark Little for web series Dad Drives.  Colin Mochrie was named Canadian comedy person of the year.

Festival and ceremony

The 14th Canadian Comedy Awards (CCA) was held in Ottawa, Ontario.  The gala awards ceremony was held on 6 October 2013 at Centrepointe Theatre hosted by Ryan Belleville. Belleville had previously hosted the 2007 CCA awards ceremony and won the Bluma Appel Award in 2001.

The awards ceremony concluded the four-day Canadian Comedy Awards Festival which ran from 3 to 6 October, with over 20 events at venues including Yuk Yuk's, Absolute Comedy, Arts Council Theatre, and Centrepointe Theatre.  Alan Thicke hosted a 4 October show featuring Ottawa natives Jon Dore, Jeremy Hotz, Tom Green, Mike MacDonald and Rebecca Kohler, and a headline show with stand-up comedians Harland Williams, Nikki Payne and Seán Cullen on 5 October.  The shows raised money for MacDonald who was making a comeback following a liver transplant. On the same evening as the Ottawa showcase, a Toronto Comedy All-Stars show was scheduled at the National Arts Centre, in what some called the Battle of Ontario.

Among the talks by industry experts was a discussion panel with Tim Long, executive producer of The Simpsons and former head-writer for David Letterman. This was the first year the festival included francophone talent with the show Le Spectacle Francophone at Yuk Yuk's on 4 October. 

Published with the festival guide was a compact history of the capital region, Ottawa: Gateway to Carp. Written by John Mazerolle with assistance from other comedians, it suggests that the infamous tedium of Ottawa made fertile ground for the growth of comedy. Festival founder and Ottawa native Tim Progosh suggested that as a government town, there has been a variety of cultures which raises one's reference level, combined with an oral tradition of the Rideau Valley where Irish and French immigrants met and shared stories.

The Jokers vs. Senators Alumni charity hockey game was held at Bell Sensplex on 5 October.  A cocktail reception raised money for the Ottawa public library.

Winners and nominees
The nomination criteria were altered this year so that feature film and television categories could include works released on the Internet.

Winners are listed first and highlighted in boldface:

Multimedia

Live

Television and Internet

Special Awards

Multiple wins
The following people, shows, films, etc. received multiple awards

Multiple nominations
The following people, shows, films, etc. received multiple nominations

Footnotes

References

External links
Canadian Comedy Awards official website

Canadian Comedy Awards
Canadian Comedy Awards
Awards
Awards